Henri Boileau (12 February 1866, Oullères near Lyon – 15 August 1924, Bois-Colombes, Paris) 
was a French entomologist who specialised in Coleoptera. Boileau worked on world fauna, notably Lucanidae. His collection is conserved by the Muséum national d'histoire naturelle. Boileau was a member of the Société entomologique de France.

Selected works
(1898) Note sur le "Catalogue de Lucanides" de M. Carl Felsche. Bulletin de la Société entomologique de France, 67: 401-437.
(1901) Description de Lucanides nouveaux. Annales de la Société royale Belge entomologique 14: 12-22.
(1913) Note sur Lucanides conservés dans les collections de l'Universités d'Oxford et du British Museum. Transactions of the Royal Entomological Society of London, 1913(2): 213-272, 1 pl.

References
Constantin, R. 1992: Memorial des Coléopteristes Français. Bull. liaison Assoc. Col. reg. parisienne, Paris (Suppl. 14) : 1-92 15 
Didier, R. 1928: [Boileau, H.] Etudes Col. Lucanides du globe 1 1-10, Portr. + Schr.verz. 
Lhoste, J. 1987: Les entomologistes français. 1750 - 1950.  INRA (Institut National de la Recherche Agronomique), Paris : 1-355 97

French entomologists
1866 births
1924 deaths